EGX may refer to:

 Egegik Airport, which has IATA airport code EGX
 Eagle Air Company, which has ICAO airline designator EGX
 Egyptian Exchange, Egypt's stock exchange
 EGX (expo), an annual video game convention